The northern wobbegong (Orectolobus wardi) is a carpet shark in the family Orectolobidae, found in the western Pacific Ocean around Australia, between latitudes 9° S to 26° S.  It reaches a length of 63 cm.

Captivity
Northern wobbegongs are excellent aquarium sharks due to their small (30 inch) adult size. They can be successfully reared in 135 gallon aquaria, but sharks in general tend to do better in aquaria 180 gallons or more in volume.

See also

 List of sharks

References

 

northern wobbegong
Marine fish of Northern Australia
Taxa named by Gilbert Percy Whitley
northern wobbegong